The Khortytskyi District is one of seven administrative urban districts (raions) of the city of Zaporizhzhia, located in southern Ukraine. Its population was 122,575 in the 2001 Ukrainian Census, and 117,871 .

Geography
It is named after the nearby Khortytsia island, a national cultural reserve. The raion is located in the southern portion of the city, on the right-bank of the Dnipro River, neighboring the villages of Baburka and Novoslobidka in Zaporizhzhia Oblast.

History
The territory of the Khortytskyi District was first inhabited by German-speaking Mennonites settling the Chortitza Colony in the late 18th century. By the 1960s, the first residential neighborhoods were being constructed in the vicinity, which at the time administratively belonged to the city's Leninskyi District.

On 19 January 1995, the Khortytskyi District was established out of a portion of the Leninskyi District by a decree of the Verkhovna Rada, Ukraine's parliament.

References

External links
 

Urban districts of Zaporizhzhia
States and territories established in 1995
1995 establishments in Ukraine